Xanthomonas oryzae is a species of bacteria. The major host of the bacterium is rice.

The species contains two pathovars, neither of which is native to Europe: X. o. pv. oryzae and X. o. pv. oryzicola.

Xanthomonas oryzae epidemics can cause yield losses ranging from 2-74%, and the bacteria can be carried on rice seeds, causing further disease spread.

The host resistance gene, Xa21, from Oryza longistaminata, is integrated into the genome of Oryza sativa for its broad-range resistance to rice leaf blight caused by X. o. pv. oryzae.

References

External links
 Xanthomonas Genomics Resource web-based database and communication forum to facilitate genomic approaches to the study of xanthomonads

Xanthomonadales
Bacterial plant pathogens and diseases
Rice diseases
Bacteria described in 1922